This article lists the results for the Serbia national football team from 2010 to 2019.

2010

2011

2012

2013

2014

2015

2016

2017

2018

2019

See also
Serbia national football team results
Serbia national football team results (2006–09)
Serbia national football team results (2020–29)

Notes

References

External links
Results at RSSSF 

2010–2019
National
National
National
National
National
National
National
National
National
National
National